The UMass Softball Complex softball field located on the campus of the University of Massachusetts Amherst in Amherst, Massachusetts. It has served as the home of the University of Massachusetts Minutewoman softball team since the spring of 2000. The field officially opened on April 1, 2000, when UMass posted a 5–2 victory over Princeton. Among the facilities available at the UMass Softball Complex are two batting cages, a bullpen that can accommodate three pitchers, heated dugouts, lockers in the UMass dugout and dugout restrooms. The surface also features a state-of-the-art drainage system which can accommodate six inches of rain per hour. 

Each year the complex typically hosts the NCAA national softball tournament Amherst Regional.

External links
Fact sheet

UMass Minutewomen softball
University of Massachusetts Amherst buildings
Softball in Massachusetts
College softball venues in the United States
2000 establishments in Massachusetts
Sports venues completed in 2000